The North East England devolution referendum was an all postal ballot referendum that took place on 4 November 2004  throughout North East England on whether or not to establish an elected assembly for the region. Devolution referendums in the regions of Northern England were initially proposed under provisions of the Regional Assemblies (Preparations) Act 2003. Initially, three referendums were planned, but only one took place. The votes concerned the question of devolving limited political powers from the UK Parliament to elected regional assemblies in North East England, North West England and Yorkshire and the Humber respectively. Each were initially planned to be held on 4 November 2004, but on 22 July 2004 the planned referendums in North West England and in Yorkshire and the Humber were postponed, due to concerns raised about the use of postal ballots, but the referendum in North East England was allowed to continue, particularly as it was assumed that the region held the most support for the proposed devolution.

On 4 November 2004, voters in the North East rejected the proposal, in an all-postal ballot, by 77.9% to 22.1%, on a turnout of 48%. Every council area in the region had a majority for "no". The referendum was held in what was at the time arguably Labour's strongest region within the United Kingdom which included at the time the then Prime Minister Tony Blair's own constituency in Sedgefield. The defeat marked the end of the Labour Government's policy of devolution for England, and the other proposed referendums for the North West and for Yorkshire and the Humber were dropped indefinitely. This would also be the last major devolution referendum to be held in any part of the United Kingdom under the Labour Government of 1997–2010.

The campaign against the proposed Assembly was successfully led by local businessman John Elliott, who argued that the institution would have no real powers and that it would be a "white elephant" and too centric to Newcastle upon Tyne.

It was the first major referendum to be held in any part of the United Kingdom which was conducted and overseen by the Electoral Commission after its establishment in 2000 under the Political Parties, Elections and Referendums Act 2000.

Background
The Labour government attempted to introduce directly elected English regional assemblies. The London Assembly was the first of these, established following a referendum in 1998, in which public and media attention was focused principally on the post of Mayor of London.

Assembly proposals

Voters were asked whether they wanted an elected regional assembly to be created for their region. The structure and powers of elected regional assemblies was outlined in a Draft Regional Assemblies Bill presented to Parliament by Deputy Prime Minister John Prescott in July 2004.

The draft bill proposed the following structure:
 The assembly would be a body corporate with a distinct legal identity.
 Each assembly would be composed of between 25 and 35 assembly members elected by the additional member system.
 The assembly would select one member as the chairman and another as deputy chairman to preside over its debates.
 The assembly would have an Executive (cabinet) composed of a Leader and between two and six Executive Members.

The draft bill would have given the assemblies the following powers:
 Promotion of economic development
 Promotion of social development
 Promote health, safety and security
 Reduce health inequalities
 Enhance individual participation in society
 Improve the availability of good housing
 Improve skills and the availability of training
 Improve the availability of cultural and recreational activities
 Improvement and protection of the environment
 Additional functions and duties that the Secretary of State thinks appropriate

Local government reorganisation
The creation of regional assemblies was to be tied to abolition of the existing two-tier structure for local government in these regions; and its replacement with a uniform system of unitary authorities.  In areas that had two-tier government (Cheshire, County Durham, Cumbria, Lancashire, North Yorkshire, Northumberland), voters were to be asked which pattern of unitary government they would like to see.

Two options were proposed by the Boundary Committee for each county in the review area – generally consisting of a single unitary authority for the entire county, or a break-up into smaller authorities which are larger than the existing districts.  It was recommended that ceremonial counties be left untouched in most cases.  This recommendation was broadly (with one minor alteration in West Lancashire) accepted by the Office of the Deputy Prime Minister.

Voting was to take place on a per-county council-area basis, except that the Cumbria and Lancashire votes would have been run as one – since it would be impossible to have option 1 in one and option 2 in another.

Any changes as a result of the North East referendum would probably have come into effect on 1 April 2006 – to give time for preparation, and taking into account 1 April as the traditional day of local government reform in the UK.

In Lancashire and Cumbria the proposals for multiple unitary authorities were very similar to those proposed by the Redcliffe-Maud Report in 1969.  This proposed authorities for North Cumbria based in Carlisle, and one for Morecambe Bay covering Barrow-in-Furness and Lancaster for the north of the region.  In central Lancashire there were to be divided into four authorities based on Blackpool, Preston, Blackburn and Burnley.  The area of West Lancashire was to be given to Merseyside and included with Southport in a district.

The options were as follows for North East England:

North East England

County Durham

Northumberland

Referendum questions
All voters in the North East England region were asked to vote on the question of whether or not there should be an elected Assembly. Voters in County Durham and Northumberland were asked to vote on an additional second question on proposals for local government reorganisation in the event of a "yes" vote.

Assembly referendum question
The question that appeared on ballot papers was:

permitting a simple YES / NO answer (to be marked with a single (X)).

Local Government reorganisation referendum question
The question that appeared on ballot papers in County Durham and Northumberland was:

with the responses to the question to be (to be marked with a single (X)):

Results
On 4 November 2004, in a turnout of almost 48% in an all postal ballot, voters in the North East decisively rejected the proposed regional assembly. The reasons for this result are varied; however, it is felt that the regional power would have been concentrated in an Assembly situated in Newcastle upon Tyne, which given the strong historic rivalries between urban centres in the North-East may have caused resentment from the people of Sunderland and Middlesbrough. Notwithstanding this, in the Newcastle upon Tyne local council area itself the majority of votes cast were against the proposal. It was also felt that not enough of a case had been put forward for the necessity of the Assembly, and it was feared that it would add another layer of politicians and public servants, thereby increasing taxes for the citizens of the areas affected.

Assembly question result
The referendum result was declared at 00:52 GMT on Friday 5 November 2004 at Crowtree Leisure Centre in Sunderland by the Chief Counting Officer for the North East region Ged Fitzgerald, who was also then Chief Executive of Sunderland City Council.

Results by local council areas

* Valid and rejected votes divided by electorate.

Local government reorganisation question result

The related votes in Northumberland and County Durham on local government changes became moot, though new single merged unitary authorities were later established based on the county council areas (i.e. Option A in each case) as part of the 2009 structural changes to local government in England.  The votes had been:

* Valid and rejected votes divided by electorate.

Planned referendums in North West England and Yorkshire and the Humber

Similar referendums had been planned in North West England and Yorkshire and the Humber.  These were postponed on 22 July due to issues with all-postal ballots – there were many allegations of fraud and procedural irregularities.  Following the rejection of the proposal in the north east of England the Deputy Prime Minister John Prescott at the time, ruled out holding further referendums in other regions for the foreseeable future.

North West England
These were the proposals for local government reorganisation in Northwest England. After the result in North East England the planned referendum for the region was postponed indefinitely and was never put before the electorate.

Cheshire

Cumbria

Lancashire

Yorkshire and the Humber
These were the proposals for local government reorganisation in the Yorkshire and the Humber region. After the result in North East England the planned referendum was postponed indefinitely and was also never put before the electorate.

North Yorkshire

See also
Referendums in the United Kingdom
1998 Greater London Authority referendum

References

External links
UK Electoral Commission

Referendums in England
2004 in England
2004 referendums
Politics of Cheshire
Politics of County Durham
Politics of Cumbria
Politics of Lancashire
Politics of North Yorkshire
Politics of Northumberland
Devolution in the United Kingdom
Governance of England
2004 elections in the United Kingdom
November 2004 events in the United Kingdom
Northern England